Two Japanese destroyers have been named Nenohi:

 , a  launched in 1905 and stricken in 1928
 , a  launched in 1932 and sunk in 1942

Imperial Japanese Navy ship names
Japanese Navy ship names